St Augustine's College  at Duckspool, Abbeyside in Dungarvan is a co-educational secondary school in Waterford, Ireland. It was founded and is now conducted by the Irish Augustinians. The school has been located at its Duckspool campus, Abbeyside since 1972. This follows a long history of providing education at the former campus which was located at Main Street and Friary Street in Dungarvan town. At this time it was a boarding school for boys and continued as such at the new campus until 1990 when the decision was taken to become a co-educational facility. In time the boarding section was scaled down until it became a day school in the mid 1990s.

Sports
The school encourages its students in many different areas of sport. The school's facilities include a 40 × 20 ft handball alley with glass back wall and viewing gallery, a 60 × 30 ft handball alley, a 120 × 60 ft gym, 6 GAA pitches, 1 soccer pitch, an 8-lane sprint track, a long & triple jump track, shot put, discus and hammer Circles, an all-weather hockey pitch, and also facilities for the high jump, javelin, and pole vault events.

Since 1997, St Augustine's College has competed in a mini-Olympics type of European sporting event known as Superschools. The college hosted the event in 1998 and 2008 and won both times. In the 24 years of the competition, St. Augustine's College have won nine times, eight of which have been consecutive – the only school in Europe to achieve this. Usually schools from eight other countries compete. Their most recent win was in 2018.

Patron Saint
The college is named in honour of the 4th-century saint, Augustine of Hippo. Other English-speaking Augustinian Schools with the same patron include Richland, New Jersey; San Diego, California – both in the United States; Manila in the Philippines; a school in Malta, another Irish one in New Ross, and one in Sydney, Australia.

Augustine was a key figure in the doctrinal development of Western Christianity and is often referred to as a "Doctor of the Church" by Roman Catholics. Two of his surviving works, namely "The Confessions" (his autobiography) and "The City of God", are regarded as Western classics and are still read by Christians around the world. Augustine is often considered one of the theological fountainheads of Reformation, because of his teaching on salvation and grace, Martin Luther himself also having been an Augustinian friar. Augustine was not a Biblical fundamentalist.

Notable alumni

 John Deasy (Politician) 
 Dr. Liam Hennessy (Athlete - National & International Pole Vault, Exercise Physiologist, former IRFU Fitness Advisor, founder of Setanta College, and current fitness advisor to Pádraig Harrington)
 James Phelan (2017 IFTA award-winning writer - Creator of the RTE series "Striking Out" and the TG4 1916 Easter Rising series "Éirí Amach Amú", and "Rásaí na Gaillimhe.")
 Matt Shanahan  (born 1964/5), independent TD for  Waterford

References

External links
 St. Augustine's College Dungarvan homepage
 The Science room at St Augustine's Dungarvan c. 1900
 International Order of St. Augustine
  Text of the Rule of St. Augustine
 Catholic Encyclopedia entry for the "Hermits of St Augustine"
 Order of the Hermit Friars of St. Augustine (O.S.A.)

Catholic secondary schools in the Republic of Ireland
Augustinian schools
Educational institutions established in 1874
1874 establishments in Ireland
Secondary schools in County Waterford